The 1984–85 Women's IHF Cup was the fourth edition of the competition. As eighteen teams took part in the competition instead of the previous edition's twelve, with Bulgaria and Turkey making their debut, the Round of 16 was reinstated. Vorwärts Frankfurt defeated Vasas Budapest in the final to become the first East German club to win the trophy.

Preliminary round

Round of 16

Quarter-finals

Semifinals

Final

References

Women's EHF Cup
IHF Cup Women
IHF Cup Women